The following is a list of Radio Disney Music Award winners and nominees for Most Talked About Artist.

Winners and nominees

2000s

2010s

References

Most Talked About Artist